In enzymology, a guanidinobutyrase is an enzyme that catalyzes the chemical reaction

4-guanidinobutanoate + H2O  4-aminobutanoate + urea

Thus, the two substrates of this enzyme are 4-guanidinobutanoate and H2O, whereas its two products are 4-aminobutanoate and urea.

This enzyme belongs to the family of hydrolases, those acting on carbon-nitrogen bonds other than peptide bonds, specifically in linear amidines.  The systematic name of this enzyme class is 4-guanidinobutanoate amidinohydrolase. Other names in common use include gamma-guanidobutyrase, 4-guanidinobutyrate amidinobutyrase, gamma-guanidinobutyrate amidinohydrolase, G-Base, GBH, and guanidinobutyrate ureahydrolase.  This enzyme participates in urea cycle and metabolism of amino groups.  It employs one cofactor, manganese.

References

 
 
 
 

EC 3.5.3
Manganese enzymes
Enzymes of unknown structure